2-Hydroxybenzylamine (2-HOBA, marketed as Hobamine) is a natural product found in Himalayan tartary buckwheat (Fagopyrum tataricum). It acts as an antioxidant and scavanger of free radicals and isolevuglandins and is sold as a dietary supplement.

References 

Phenols